North Wales station is a station along the SEPTA Lansdale/Doylestown Line located at Beaver and School Streets in North Wales, Pennsylvania.  In FY 2017, North Wales station had a weekday average of 974 boardings and 855 alightings.  The station includes a 167-space parking lot. Parking is available on both sides of the tracks between Beaver Street and Walnut Street, which includes an entrance at Walnut and 5th Streets. The east parking lot runs between the tracks and 6th Street/Railroad Street. School Street runs through the west parking lot, and then turns southwest while that parking lot continues to follow the tracks, almost reaching Walnut Street.

North Wales station was originally built in 1873 by the Reading Railroad, and previously contained a cupola over the ticket window, iron support under the overhanging roof, and a matching shelter on the opposite side of the tracks. At some point it was moved 2500 feet from its previous location, the cupola was removed, and the support beams were replaced with wood.

Station layout
North Wales has two high-level side platforms.

References

External links
SEPTA - North Wales Station
 Station from Walnut Street from Google Maps Street View
 Station from Beaver Street from Google Maps Street View

SEPTA Regional Rail stations
Former Reading Company stations
Railway stations in the United States opened in 1873
Railway stations in Montgomery County, Pennsylvania
Stations on the SEPTA Main Line